Sublime is an international sustainable lifestyle magazine. It is an independent bi-monthly print publication dedicated to making sustainability appealing. 

The magazine is based and published in Highgate, North London, and it is distributed in print to more than 30 countries worldwide.

The company is subsidised solely by advertising and sales of the printed and digital copies.

History
Sublime was founded in 2004 by husband-and-wife Damian and Laura Santamaria. In March 2004, they gathered a group of 30 media industry people to test their concept. Out of these discussions, the core contributors team was formed. The concept was then promoted through events, thinktank meetings and the launch of the website. By 2005, Sublime had a group of 300 opinion-makers from around the world who were willing to be involved in spreading the Sublime philosophy. 

Issue 0 (taster issue) was launched in September 2006, with 200,000 copies inserted into The Times and the Waitrose magazine. Issue 1 was published in January 2007 with the theme `reversing the order` featuring model Alek Wek on the front cover.

In the early days of the magazine's production, it was featured in an advertisement that was displayed in front of the Queen at the opening of St Pancras railway station in a video called The New Age of Travel. The magazine cover featured prominently at the beginning as a woman read it on the train. 

It has also appeared in a video on Current TV, with the caption: "Beauty isn't skin deep. Sublime magazine launches the first international ethical glossy."

The magazine has featured advertisers such as Rolex (Award for Enterprise), Divine Chocolate, Nikon, Kuoni Travel, Missoni, Rado, Oxfam, Barclays Wealth, Weleda, IWC, Lexus, Lavazza, Smart, Ben & Jerry's, Zegna and Paul Smith parfums amongst others.

Topics
Sublime covers topics such as nature, energy, fashion, technology, design and architecture, culture, food and well-being. There is a strong emphasis on community, fair trade, natural and organic products, clean technologies and sustainability. With regular features by Wayne Hemingway MBE, Jeremy Leggett, Dr Frances Corner, John Grant and Hanspeter Kuenzler. on recent and relevant topics. Music reviews, book reviews and an editorial also feature alongside other articles.

Every issue of Sublime magazine has a topic or theme that the articles and other features inside relate to. Regeneration, Eclectic and Thinkers have been themes of past issues.

Philosophy behind the magazine
Sublime aims to promote concepts of originality, ethical values, sustainability and diversity through its content. It is set to inspire and empower today's well-informed and well-connected readers. The sticker on the front cover of each issue reads "for creative thinkers and enquiring minds".

The magazine originally launched with the tagline "the first ethical international lifestyle magazine", but after the first year changed to "the first sustainable international lifestyle magazine".

The editors of the magazine said in their editorial in issue 26 that "sex, money and celebrity are the three pedestals on which mainstream magazines currently stand. When we started Sublime five years ago, we set out to challenge this convention by basing our publication on the somewhat more opposing principles of integrity, respect and interdependence."

Sublime'''s purpose is not to produce yet another green or eco magazine, but to promote a post-consumerism lifestyle that satisfies the interests of a 'transition generation'.

The magazine publishes its motto on its Facebook page:
Now that the future happened yesterday
Now that we are not what we can buy
Now that we don't want to get anywhere any faster
Now that we want to make poverty history
Now that people are the most important thing for people
Now that we know that the greatest risk is not to risk
Now that we don't need to be asleep to dream
Now it's time to start again

Another phrase that can often be seen is: "Bringing aesthetics & ethics together with style & soul", found throughout issues of the magazine.

Developments
The magazine is trying to develop further than print. One such development is with the Sublime Econic Award, which was launched during March 2010, in Issue 20. In the issue, it explains that "Sublime will reveal the pioneering brands that have a long-standing tradition of empathy towards the environment, those that have made groundbreaking innovations in the eco market." Weleda won the first-ever Econic award, with a model wearing a dress made from their Pomegranate Bodycare Packaging. The creative team of Sublime is responsible for the design, production and photographic shoot of a tailor-made outfit using 'eco' products.

Another branch of the company is the sublimemagazine.es website which is a Spanish translation of the English online website. Globally, approximately 450 million people speak Spanish with correspondents in Madrid, Barcelona, Mexico, São Paulo, Buenos Aires, Rio de Janeiro, Bogota and more; the website wants to reach these Spanish-speaking countries.teens.sublimemagazine.com wants to reach out to a younger audience with a blog for teenagers. The website is run by a teenage editor and contributors and features articles and topics that it thinks teenagers would be interested in, such as music, fashion beauty and grooming.

Feedback
The Guardian published an article on Sublime and Lunch magazines in 2006. The article says that "Sublime hopes that companies will put their money where their socially responsible mouths are." It also summarises the magazine's principles in its subtitle: "Two new glossy magazines aim to show that good taste and ethical principles do mix. So will they attract enough advertisers?"

TreeHugger, a prominent sustainability website, wrote about the magazine in 2005: "They have invested much time and energy into setting up the company and putting together a stellar international team of writers, photographers and other contributors.

"In the notoriously competitive world of magazine publishing where several new publications go under each year, the Sublime team have been meticulous in their market research".

Divine Chocolate marketing director Charlotte Borger said "We are proud to say that we have supported Sublime since its launch. It is a beautiful magazine and they are a great partner for Divine".

"Sublime is visionary and unique. Your recent issue on water has triggered many ideas", said Francesco Bandarin, Director General for Culture Director of the World Heritage Centre.

Editors
Damian and Laura Santamaria are the editorial directors of the magazine, both of them come from a background in branding and new product/business development. They are of an Italian Argentine origin, and graduated from the National University of La Plata with an MA in visual communications. The university was pioneered by Tomás Maldonado, who "is considered one of the main theorists of the legendary Ulm Model", which "was one of the most progressive institutions for teaching design and environmental design in the 1950s and 1960s."Ulm School of Design, Retrieved 07/06/2011.

In 2001, the Santamarias published a book titled Santamaria: Identity. The book features a collection of work including corporate identity, packaging and retail design as well as conceptual art, sculpture and photography developed by the Santamarias during their first 10 years of professional practice. The book was launched in October 2001 at Zwemmers, Soho, London. It was released at Panta Rei in Madrid at the same time.

Blueprint magazine published an article about the editors in 2001. The journalist writes: "Here's an international, cross-disciplinary network that truly speaks the same language. Its members cover visual communication, product design, fashion and architecture." The says Laura and Damian set up their business in a less-than-traditional way - in a "bullish approach" that "seems to have paid off" and is "refreshing" in the UK industry.

Contributors
There are currently 19 regular contributors to the magazine, in addition to other guest contributors and contributors who no longer work with the magazine.

 Wayne Hemingway MBE, co-founder of fashion label Red or Dead and Hemingway Design. London Leader 2010.
 Jeremy Leggett, CEO of Solar Century and Solaroid. US Climate Institute's Award for Advancing Understanding. Jeremy has recently been appointed a CNN Principal Voice.
 Stephen Armstrong, journalist for Sunday Times, The Guardian, GQ and Wallpaper.
 Hanspeter Kuenzler, London-based Swiss journalist specialising in music, arts and football.
 Dr Frances Corner OBE, Head of the London College of Fashion. Frances has pioneered the adoption of sustainable and ethical practice into the fashion education curriculum. London Leader 2012.
 John Grant, co-founder of St Luke's advertising agency. Author of The Green Marketing Manifesto and Co-opportunity''.
 David Buckland, artist and founder of Cape Farewell.
 Jenny Page
 Georgina-Kate Adams
 Jonathan Fordham
 Jen Marsden, former editor of the New Consumer magazine and current Home and Lifestyle Editor of Green Guide.
 Leo Kent, former assistant editor and contributor to the Sunday Telegraph.
 Alan Mann
 Piero
 Io Takemura
 Tom Savage
 Samantha Davis
 Tom Willcocks
 Sandor Hatvany
 George Clode
 Sam Feast

References

External links 
 Official Website https://sublimemagazine.com/
 Jason Clark, Sublime Magazine - Defining the new cool with a conscience, Retrieved 06/06/2011.
 Petz Scholtus, Sublime - First International Ethical Lifestyle Magazine, Retrieved 06/06/2011.
 idUnited, idUnited - Sublime Magazine, Retrieved 06/06/2011.
 CapeFarewell, Cape Farewell, Retrieved 06/06/2011
 Sublime Teens, Sublime Teens, Retrieved 06/06/2011.
Magazine Spain, Retrieved 06/06/2011.
 Sublime Magazine Spain, Sublime 

Bi-monthly magazines published in the United Kingdom 
Independent magazines 
Lifestyle magazines published in the United Kingdom 
Magazines established in 2004 
Magazines published in London